Academic degrees
Music
Music education organizations
Music industry